Friedrich Beckh (17 January 1908 – 21 June 1942) was 48 victory-Luftwaffe flying ace and recipient of the Knight's Cross of the Iron Cross. The Knight's Cross of the Iron Cross was awarded to recognise extreme battlefield bravery or successful military leadership. He held the position of Geschwaderkommodore of fighter wing Jagdgeschwader 51 and Jagdgeschwader 52.

Early life and career
Beckh was born on 17 January 1908 in Nuremberg. He was a career soldier having joined the cavalry in 1926 as part of the-then 100,000 strong German Army. He joined the Luftwaffe with the rank of Oberleutnant in 1935 and trained to be a fighter pilot but Beckh had no particular aptitude for flying.

World War II
By the time World War II broke out he had already occupied several positions on the General Staff and because of his age did not fly any combat sorties. Instead, he was lecturing at the Air War Academy. It was during 1940 as Jägerverbindungsoffizier in the Luftgaukommando Wiesbaden (fighter communications or liaison officer) that he became close friends with Werner Mölders, the two men served in Jagdgeschwader 134 Horst Wessel. When Mölders became Geschwaderkommodore (wing commander) of Jagdgeschwader 51 (JG 51—51st Fighter Wing) on 27 July 1940 he arranged for Beckh to transfer to his Geschwaderstab, as an officer on secondment from the General Staff.

Beckh was nonetheless an enthusiastic fighter pilot. However, there was one further factor in Beckh's make-up that would constitute something of a handicap when flying fighters. He was simply unable to see anything in the air. In fact, Beckh's eyesight had deteriorated considerably since he had first joined the Luftwaffe.

Group commander
On 1 March 1941, Beckh was appointed Gruppenkommandeur (group commander) of IV. Gruppe of JG 51, succeeding Oberleutnant Hans-Karl Keitel who was transferred.

During the opening weeks of Operation Barbarossa Beckh had considerable success, mostly in tandem with his Wingman Leutnant Bernd Gallowitsch, who at the time was credited with around twenty victories. The two pilots invariably returned from sorties with a victory each.

Wing commander
On 19 July 1941, Beckh was appointed Geschwaderkommodore of JG 51. He succeeded Mölders in this capacity who transferred and appointed Inspekteur der Jagdflieger (Inspector of Fighters). Command of IV. Gruppe then passed on to Haupmann Karl-Gottfried Nordmann.

JG 51 supported Heinz Guderian's Panzerarmee in the battles around Kiev, Beckh claimed the Geschwader's 2000th victory.

During his convalescence, he was temporarily replaced by Major Günther Lützow as commander of JG 51. Two days after being wounded in action, he was awarded the Knight's Cross of the Iron Cross for 27 victories, 23 of them on the Eastern Front. He had also claimed around twenty aircraft destroyed on the ground. Initially he insisted on leading the Geschwader from the ground but on 3 October he was eventually admitted to a hospital with the foot infected.

Beckh returned to the Geschwader on 21 December 1941 and he achieved approximately twenty further victories before being transferred back to the Reich Air Ministry on 9 April 1942. He was then appointed Kommodore of Jagdgeschwader 52 (JG 52—52nd Fighter Wing) on 3 June 1942 barely two months later following the death of Major Wilhelm Lessmann.

On 21 June 1942, Beckh was airborne in his Bf 109 F-4 "weiße 4" (Werknummer13362) with his wingman for a low-level sortie of the type he preferred in the area of Izium-Kupiansk-Valuyki, east of Charkov. East of Waluiki the duo observed a Russian air base with Russian fighters on the ground. Beckh dived, claiming two fighters, but his wingman observed Beckh's F-4 taking a number of flak hits before it too nosed down and appeared to plunge to the ground. The Bf 109 came down in a marsh near Valuyki. His body was found inside his fighter when the site was excavated 60 years later. At the time of his death he claimed over 40 aircraft in aerial combat and a dozen on the ground.

Summary of career

Aerial victory claims
According to Obermaier, Beckh was credited with 48 aerial victories claimed in an unknown number of combat missions. This figure includes eleven claims on the Eastern Front and four over the Western Allies. Mathews and Foreman, authors of Luftwaffe Aces — Biographies and Victory Claims, researched the German Federal Archives and found records for 40 aerial victory claims, plus two further unconfirmed claims. This figure of confirmed claims includes four aerial victories on the Western Front and 36 on the Eastern Front.

Awards
 Iron Cross (1939) 2nd and 1st class
 Honor Goblet of the Luftwaffe (11 May 1942)
 Knight's Cross of the Iron Cross on 18 September 1941 as Major and Geschwaderkommodore of Jagdgeschwader 51

Notes

References

Citations

Bibliography

External links

1908 births
1942 deaths
Military personnel from Nuremberg
Luftwaffe pilots
German World War II flying aces
Luftwaffe personnel killed in World War II
Recipients of the Knight's Cross of the Iron Cross
Aviators killed by being shot down
People from the Kingdom of Bavaria